José Ángel Hevia Velasco, known professionally as Hevia (born October 11, 1967 in Villaviciosa, Asturias), is a Spanish bagpiper – specifically, an Asturian gaita player. He commonly performs with his sister, María José, on drums. In 1992 he was awarded first prize for solo bagpipes at the Festival Interceltique de Lorient, Brittany.

Possibly his most recognisable composition is the 1998 piece Busindre Reel, from his first album Tierra de Nadie. Hevia is known for helping invent a special brand of MIDI electronic bagpipes, which he is often seen playing live. The instrument was developed with Alberto Arias (pupil and computer programmer) and the electronic technician Miguel Dopico.

Two of Hevia's tracks, La Línea Trazada and El Garrotin (single release), appeared on the cross-platform video game Vigilante 8: 2nd Offense. His music was also featured in Walt Disney World at Epcot, just before the nightly IllumiNations: Reflections of Earth fireworks show.

Early years
Hevia first came into contact with the bagpipes in 1971 during a procession in Amandi when he was with his grandfather. It was there that the image of a man and his bagpipes influenced the very young Jose Angel. The unity between the pipe player, his music and the instrument seemed magical to him. 

Hevia then began bagpipe classes. Three times a week, after school, he took the bus to Gijón. Armando Fernández taught him in the traditional style and then accompanied him back to the bus. He arrived home at 12 o'clock at night and the following day practiced what he had learned in class so he hardly had time for other leisure activities.

Discography
Tierra de Nadie (No Man's Land), 1998; released 1999 in worldwide
Al Otro Lado (At the Other Side), 2000
Etnico Ma Non Troppo, 2003
Obsesión, 2007
Lo Mejor De Hevia, 2009

See also
Spanish bagpipes

References

External links
 Official website
  Myspace
 Italian website
 Interview with Hevia (in Spanish)

1967 births
Living people
People from Villaviciosa, Asturias
Musicians from Asturias
Bagpipe players
Players of Spanish bagpipes
Spanish folk musicians
Celtic folk musicians